Russell Judson Waters (June 6, 1843 – September 25, 1911) was an American teacher, lawyer, businessman, author and one-term U.S. Representative from California at the turn of the 20th century.

Early life and education 
Born in Halifax, Vermont, Waters moved with his parents to Franklin County, Massachusetts, in 1846.
He attended the district schools.
Learned the machinist's trade in Shelburne Falls, Massachusetts.
He taught school at Charlemont Center, Massachusetts.
He was graduated from Franklin Institute (later Arms Academy), Shelburne Falls, Massachusetts, where he later was professor of Latin and mathematics.
He moved to Chicago, Illinois, in 1867.
He studied law.
He was admitted to the bar in 1868 and practiced in Chicago until 1886.

Career
He moved to California and settled in Redlands in 1886.
City attorney of Redlands in 1888.
He moved to Los Angeles in 1894.
He served as president of the Pasadena Consolidated Gas Co..
Treasurer of the Los Angeles Chamber of Commerce, vice president of the Citizens' Bank, and connected with many public institutions.

Waters was elected as a Republican to the Fifty-sixth Congress (March 4, 1899 – March 3, 1901).
He was not a candidate for renomination in 1900.

Later career and death 
He resumed banking as president of the Citizens' National Bank, Los Angeles.
He served as president of the California Cattle Co., San Jacinto, California, from 1903 to 1911.
He served as president of the San Jacinto Water Co. in 1910 and 1911.

He died in Los Angeles, California, September 25, 1911, and was interred in Hollywood Cemetery.

Bibliography
Lyric Echos. Los Angeles, CA: Times-Mirror Printing and Binding House, 1907.
El Estranjero (The stranger): a story a Southern California. Chicago, New York: Rand, McNally & company, 1910.

Sources

External links 
 

1843 births
1911 deaths
Republican Party members of the United States House of Representatives from California
19th-century American politicians
People from Halifax, Vermont
People from Franklin County, Massachusetts
People from San Jacinto, California